Hans Magnus Andresen (31 May 1929 – 4 August 1976) was a Norwegian alpine skier. He was born in Oslo, and represented the club Njård IL. He participated at the 1956 Winter Olympics in  Cortina d'Ampezzo, where he competed in slalom and giant slalom.

References

External links

1929 births
1976 deaths
Alpine skiers from Oslo
Norwegian male alpine skiers
Olympic alpine skiers of Norway
Alpine skiers at the 1956 Winter Olympics